Vitaly Vitalyevich Kafanov (born 24 May 1960) is a Kazakhstani-Turkmenistani football coach and a former player. He is an assistant coach of FC Rostov and goalkeepers' coach with Russia national football team.

Club career 
He would start his youth career in Turkmen SSR, nowadays Turkmenistan.

He began his professional career with Kolkozchi Ashkhabad. He made his senior football debut in 1982 for this club.

In the USSR championship, he also played for the Sokol Saratov, before spending one season with Uralmash Yekaterinburg in the Soviet First League.

Kafanov has extensive experience in the championship of Kazakhstan for FC Kairat and FC Elimay. He is a three-time champion of Kazakhstan (1992, 1994, 1995) and a two-time winner of the Kazakhstan Cup (1992 and 1995).

He retired at the Nisa Aşgabat in 1998.

Coach career 

Russian media consider Kafanov to be one of the country's strongest in free kicks.

Following his playing career, Kafanov became a manager, most recently with FC Rubin Kazan.

At the beginning of his career in Russia in 2001, Kafanov headed Kristall Smolensk, which finished the season in 10th place out of 18.

He worked at Rubin Kazan from 2003 with a break of 3.5 years in 2014–2017. Together with the team, he became twice the champion of Russia, won two Russian Super Cups, one Russian Cup.

In 2014–2015, he was helped to Yuri Krasnozhan in the national team of Kazakhstan.

In 2019, he entered into an agreement with the FC Rostov football club, in which he previously worked from 2015 to 2017.

In July 2021, the Russian Football Union named Kafanov as the goalkeeper coach of the Russia national football team.

On 26 October 2021, FC Rostov announced new appointment of Kafanov as a manager of the team.

International career 
Vitaly Kafanov played for two countries.

Kafanov made six appearances for the Kazakhstan national football team in 1992. He later appeared twice for his home team Turkmenistan.

Honours

Club
Kairat
Kazakhstan Premier League: 1992, 1994, 1995

Managerial honours
Rubin
Russian Premier League: 2008, 2009
Russian Cup: 2011–12
Russian Super Cup: 2010, 2012

Rostov
Russian Premier League runner-up: 2015–16

References

External links

1960 births
Living people
Sportspeople from Ashgabat
Kazakhstani footballers
Turkmenistan footballers
Kazakhstan international footballers
Turkmenistan international footballers
FC Sokol Saratov players
FC Ural Yekaterinburg players
FC Kairat players
FC Rubin Kazan managers
Turkmenistan expatriate sportspeople in Kazakhstan
Kazakhstani football managers
Turkmenistan football managers
Russian football managers
Association football goalkeepers
Kazakhstani people of Russian descent
Turkmenistan people of Russian descent
FC Rostov managers
Russian Premier League managers
Turkmenistan expatriate football managers
Expatriate football managers in Russia
Turkmenistan expatriate sportspeople in Russia
Dual internationalists (football)